Oneroa may refer to:

Oneroa, Cook Islands, located on Mangaia
Oneroa (Cook Islands electorate), a parliamentary electoral division
Oneroa, New Zealand, located on Waiheke Island